Kerry Thompson (born 12 December 1949) is an Australian cricketer. He played four first-class matches for New South Wales in 1977/78.

See also
 List of New South Wales representative cricketers

References

External links
 

1949 births
Living people
Australian cricketers
New South Wales cricketers
Cricketers from Newcastle, New South Wales